Strange Fruit Records was an independent record label in the United Kingdom.

The label, established by Clive Selwood and John Peel in 1986, was the primary distributor of BBC recordings, including Peel Sessions.

The name came from the song written by Abel Meeropol and famously performed by Billie Holiday, itself a reference to racially motivated lynchings. The label had the aim of generating sufficient revenue from recordings of 'big name' artists to allow the release of recordings by lesser-known artists. The label's first release was New Order's 1982 Peel Session, in July 1987, and was followed by sessions from some of the biggest names from the punk rock and post punk eras. Recordings from as far back as the 1960s were also released by the likes of Jimi Hendrix and Bonzo Dog Doo-Dah Band. As well as individual sessions, the label also released albums compiling several sessions by the same artist. Strange Fruit was sufficiently successful that it spawned subsidiary labels including Nighttracks (sessions from radio One's Evening Show), Raw Fruit Records (concert recordings from the Reading Festival), and Band of Joy (BBC session recordings from the 1960s and 1970s). In 1994, Peel's BBC colleague Andy Kershaw started another subsidiary label, Strange Roots, which released session recordings by world music and roots artists from his radio show.

Strange Fruit closed in 2004. It was part of the Zomba Group of companies and was shut down when the label merged with BMG. The last release the label put together was an album of New Order's complete Peel Sessions, fitting seeing as the first release that came out was an EP of New Order's first Peel session. Six months later John Peel died.

Clive Selwood died in June 2020.

Strange Fruit Records Catalogue (Peel Sessions, BBC)
Individual artists

 SFPS001	New Order
 SFPS002	The Damned
 SFPS003	The Screaming Blue Messiahs
 SFPS004	Stiff Little Fingers
 SFPS005	Sudden Sway
 SFPS006	The Wild Swans
 SFPS007	Madness
 SFPS008	Gang of Four
 SFPS009	The Wedding Present
 SFPS010	Twa Toots
 SFPS011	The Ruts
 SFPS012	Siouxsie and the Banshees
 SFPS013	Joy Division
 SFPS014	The Primevals
 SFPS015	June Tabor
 SFPS016	The Undertones
 SFPS017	Xmal Deutschland
 SFPS018	The Specials
 SFPS019	Stump
 SFPS020	The Birthday Party
 SFPS021	The Slits
 SFPS022	Spizz Oil
 SFPS023	The June Brides
 SFPS024	Culture
 SFPS025	The Prefects
 SFPS026	Yeah Yeah Noh
 SFPS027	Billy Bragg
 SFPS028	The Fall
 SFPS029	Girls at Our Best!
 SFPS030	The Redskins
 SFPS031	T.Rex
 SFPS032	Tubeway Army
 SFPS033	Joy Division
 SFPS034	The Adverts
 SFPS035	The Mighty Wah
 SFPS036	The Triffids
 SFPS037	Robert Wyatt
 SFPS038	That Petrol Emotion
 SFPS039	New Order
 SFPS040	The Damned
 SFPS041	Wire
 SFPS042	Electro Hippies
 SFPS043	Syd Barrett
 SFPS044	Buzzcocks
 SFPS045	Cud
 SFPS046	The Very Things
 SFPS047	Ultravox
 SFPS048	Extreme Noise Terror
 SFPS049	Napalm Death
 SFPS050	The Cure
 SFPS051	The Bonzo Dog Band
 SFPS052	The Nightingales
 SFPS053	Intense Degree
 SFPS054	Stupids
 SFPS055	The Smiths
 SFPS056	Bolt Thrower
 SFPS057	Half Man Half Biscuit
 SFPS058	The Birthday Party
 SFPS059	Lindisfarne
 SFPS060	Echo & the Bunnymen
 SFPS061	Family
 SFPS062	The Room
 SFPS063	Eton Crop
 SFPS064	Nico
 SFPS065	The Jimi Hendrix Experience
 SFPS066	Siouxsie and the Banshees
 SFPS067	Amayenge
 SFPS068	Ivor Cutler
 SFPS069	Unseen Terror
 SFPS070	The Four Brothers
 SFPS071	A Guy Called Gerald
 SFPS072	Inspiral Carpets
 SFPS073	Carcass
 SFPS074	The Go-Betweens
 SFPS075	The Associates
 SFPS076	Colorblind James Experience
 SFPS080	The Jam
 SFPS081       Teenage Fanclub

Compilations

 SFRLP100	The Sampler
 SFRLP101	Hardcore Holocaust
 SFRCD119      Too Pure (Th' Faith Healers, Stereolab, PJ Harvey)
 SFRLP200	21 Years Of Alternative Radio 1
 SFRLP111      Joy Division

Other albums
 SFRSCD016 or SFRSCD079 - Tom Paxton, Live In Concert (recorded in London, England in 1971 and 1972, released 1998)
 SFRSCD035 - Melanie, On Air [taken from November 75 concert, with added sessions from 1969 & 1989)
 SFRSCD036 - Joe Cocker and The Grease Band, On Air [taken from Top Gear 13 Oct 68; Symonds 14 Oct 68; DLT 21 Sept 69; and Top Gear 11 Oct 69) Released 1997
 SFRSCD037 - The Delgados, BBC Sessions (1997)
 SFRSCD077 - A House, Live In Concert
 SFRSCD082 - Inspiral Carpets, Radio 1 Sessions (1999)
 SFPSCD090 - Uzeda Recorded 8/5/1994 Maide Vale Studios BBC
 SFRSCD094 - Joy Division, The Complete BBC Recordings (2000)
 SFNT015 - Icicle Works "Radio 1 Sessions - The Evening Show" - Four track 12" EP, recorded 1982, released 1988.
 SFRCD114 - The Chameleons "John Peel Sessions" (1990)
 SFRCD201 - Soft Machine "The Peel Sessions" - All tracks recorded for BBC Top Gear.

A bootleg of the White Power rock band Skrewdriver's Peel Session exists, in very bad quality and with a cover in the style of the Strange Fruit Peel Session releases. It however is not a Strange Fruit release.

See also
 Dandelion Records, a record label previously established by John Peel which operated from 1969 to 1973
 List of record labels
 List of independent UK record labels
 :Category:Peel Sessions recordings

References

External links
 
 
 Strange Fruit Peel Sessions

British independent record labels
Indie rock record labels
 
Record labels established in 1986
Record labels disestablished in 2004
1986 establishments in the United Kingdom
2004 disestablishments in the United Kingdom
John Peel